Change the World: An Introduction to Dokken is a compilation album by American heavy metal band Dokken, released by Sanctuary UK.

Track listing
"Erase the Slate" - 3:47
"Little Girl" - 3:45
"Change the World" - 4:35
"It's Not Love" (unplugged) - 5:22
"Maddest Hatter" - 4:38
"Goodbye My Friend" - 4:05
"Breaking the Chains" (live) - 4:14
"Alone Again" (live) - 7:23
"Puppet on a String" - 4:22
"Drown" - 4:54
"Tooth and Nail" (unplugged) - 3:37
"Sunless Days" - 4:21
"Unchain the Night" (live) - 6:27
"Escape" - 4:38
"Crazy Mary Goes Around" - 3:00
"In My Dreams" (live) - 6:15
"Into the Fire" (unplugged) - 4:55

References

Dokken compilation albums
2004 compilation albums
Sanctuary Records compilation albums